Keristan may refer to:
Kerista, a religion
Keristan, Iran, a village